Madam is a respectful title for a woman (often "Ma'am" or "Madame").

Madam may also refer to:

 Madam (prostitution), a term for a woman who is engaged in the business of procuring prostitutes, usually the manager of a brothel
 MADAM-6, a psychoactive drug
 Madam (fashion), a Japanese fashion style
 Madam (band), an English rock band
 Madam (film), a 1994 Telugu comedy film
 Madam, Yemen
 Al Madam, an inland town of Sharjah, UAE

See also
Madame